El Centro Español may refer to:

El Centro Español de Tampa
El Centro Español of West Tampa